65 Ursae Majoris, abbreviated as 65 UMa, is a star system in the constellation of Ursa Major. With a combined apparent magnitude of about 6.5, it is at the limit of human eyesight and is just barely visible to the naked eye in ideal conditions. It is about 760 light years away from Earth.

65 Ursae Majoris is a sextuple star system. It contains six stars in a hierarchical orbit where each star orbits its inner stars. Such systems are uncommon, with only a few sextuple stars known. Higher-multiplicity star systems are uncommon because they are less stable than their simpler counterparts, and often decay into smaller systems.

Multiplicity
Hierarchy of orbits in the 65 Ursae Majoris system
The central pair of stars, 65 Ursae Majoris Aa1 and Aa2, are both A-type main-sequence stars. They have relatively low masses for A-type main sequence stars and have spectral types of A7V. Its orbital period is 1.73 days.

The innermost binary pair 65 Ursae Majoris Aa is orbited by another star, designated 65 Ursae Majoris Ab. It is a spectroscopic binary: while the pair cannot be resolved, periodic Doppler shifts in their spectra indicate that there must be orbital motion. 65 Ursae Majoris Ab orbits the inner pair with a period of 641 days (1.76 years) and an eccentricity of 0.169.

65 Ursae Majoris B orbits the three inner stars every 118 years. Speckle interferometry results have resolved 65 Ursae Majoris D into two components separated by  but this has not been confirmed by other observers. The two stars resolved differ in brightness by about two magnitudes. An orbit for two stars has been estimated to have a period of about 79 years.

Variability

65 Ursae Majoris A is a variable star with the variable star designation DN Ursae Majoris.  The pair Aa1 and Aa2 form an eclipsing binary as they periodically pass in front of each other while orbiting.  The primary and secondary eclipses are almost identical and the apparent magnitude of the system varies between 6.55 and 6.65 twice during each orbit of 1.73 days.  The brightness variation is very small because the non-eclipsing component Ab is the brightest of the three stars and contributes 80% of the visible light.

Distance
Trigonometric parallax measurements made by the Hipparcos spacecraft put the 65 Ursae Majoris ABC system at a distance of about 690 light years (210 parsecs), and component D at about 1,000 light years (300 parsecs). Gaia has published measurements for the AB system and for component D, but they are both highly uncertain.

See also
Castor, another multiple star system with six stars
Zeta Phoenicis, a multiple star system including an eclipsing binary

References

Spectroscopic binaries
Algol variables
6
058112
103483
4560
Durchmusterung objects
Ursae Majoris, DN
Ursae Majoris, 65
A-type main-sequence stars
Ursa Major (constellation)
Ap stars